Barrett Hayton (born June 9, 2000) is a Canadian ice hockey centre currently playing for the  Arizona Coyotes of the National Hockey League (NHL). He was drafted 5th overall by the Coyotes in the 2018 NHL Entry Draft.

Playing career

Minor and major junior hockey
Hayton, as a native of Peterborough, Ontario, first played minor midget hockey with the Peterborough Petes and the Toronto Red Wings. He also played for the Upper Canada College team as a student there from 2015 to 2016. In showing early offensive promise, scoring 73 points in 59 games as a 15-year old with the Red Wings, Hayton was selected 9th overall in the 2016 OHL Priority Selection by the Sault Ste. Marie Greyhounds. On June 17, 2016, he agreed to terms with the Greyhounds to begin his major junior career in the 2016–17 season.

In his rookie campaign, Hayton was eased into the lineup and scored a respectable 27 points in 63 games. In the following 2017–18 season, Hayton continued his upwards development in progressing to almost a point-per-game pace with 60 points in 63 games. He was nominated and won the Bobby Smith Trophy as the OHL's Scholastic Player of the Year.

Arizona Coyotes
With his draft stocks rising throughout the season, Hayton was ranked in the top 10 North American skaters to end the season by the NHL Central Scouting Bureau. On June 22, 2018, Hayton's rise up the rankings was realised as he was selected 5th overall by the Arizona Coyotes at the 2018 NHL Entry Draft.

On July 6, 2018, Hayton was signed to a three-year, entry-level contract with the Arizona Coyotes. Hayton started the 2018–19 season with the Coyotes in the NHL, but after being scratched for the Coyotes' first two games of the season he was reassigned to the Greyhounds. Upon his return to juniors, Hayton was named team captain.

After attending the Coyotes 2019 training camp, he made his NHL debut on October 10, 2019, against the Vegas Golden Knights. Hayton recorded his first NHL point in the game, a secondary assist on Nick Schmaltz's first period goal, as well as his first NHL minor penalty. In his third NHL game, on October 25, 2019, Hayton recorded his first NHL goal. Hayton's goal was the game-winning goal, scored against the New Jersey Devils' goaltender, Mackenzie Blackwood, on an assist from Nick Schmaltz.

On November 21, 2019, Hayton played in his 10th NHL game of the season. This appearance triggered the start of his three-year NHL entry-level contract. An NHL team can defer an 18- or 19-year-old's NHL entry-level contract by one year if the player is reassigned to his junior team before he plays 10 NHL games in a season.

On December 12, 2019, the Coyotes announced the loan of Hayton to Canada's under-20 world junior hockey team for the 2020 IIHF World U20 Championship, held in the Czech Republic from December 26 to January 5. On January 8, 2020, following the conclusion of the IIHF World U20 Championship, the Coyotes recalled Hayton. On February 5, 2020, Hayton was sent down to the AHL's Tucson Roadrunners on a 5-game conditioning assignment.

Hayton rejoined the Coyotes and played in 6 more games before the season was cut short due to the COVID-19 pandemic. Hayton travelled with the team to Edmonton for the play-in series against the Nashville Predators. Hayton appeared in 2 of those games, but did not register a point. In the following playoff series against the Colorado Avalanche, Hayton appeared in 1 game before the Coyotes were eliminated from post-season play.

On October 18, 2020, Hayton was loaned by the Coyotes to Finnish Liiga club, Ilves, until the start of NHL training camp. He made 8 appearances in the 2020–21 Liiga season, registering 4 assists for Ilves, before returning to the Coyotes.

Hatyon began the 2020–21 NHL season with the Coyotes. Through to February 22, 2021, he played in 14 games, recording 2 goals and a single assist. 
On February 22, 2021, the Coyotes assigned him to the AHL to play with the Tucson Roadrunners. Hayton previously played in Tucson for five games last season on a conditioning stint. This season is the first year that he is eligible to play in the AHL full-time.

Hatyon began the 2021–22 NHL season with the Tucson Roadrunners. On October 26, 2021, the Coyotes recalled Hayton from Tucson. Hayton made his 2021-2022 NHL season debut on October 28, 2021, the Coyotes's 7th game of the season. Hayton underwent wrist surgery in early January 2022 and was placed on injured reserve. Hayton was out of the Coyote line-up for 16 games and returned on February 9, 2022. At the conclusion of the 2021-2022 NHL season, Hayton became a restricted free agent. The Coyotes extended a qualifying offer to Hayton on July 11th, whereby the Coyotes retained negotiating rights with Hayton.

On September 20, 2022, Hayton signed a two-year, $3.55 million contract with the Coyotes.

International play

 

Hayton played for Team Canada in the Ivan Hlinka Memorial Tournament where he led Canada in goals scored. Hayton played for Canada's under-20 world junior hockey team at the 2019 IIHF World U20 Championship, in which Canada finished in sixth place.

Hayton was named captain of Canada's under-20 world junior hockey team that played in the 2020 World Junior Ice Hockey Championships. In Canada's round robin 6–0 loss to Russia, Hayton did not remove his helmet during the playing of the Russian national anthem. Removing one's helmet while an anthem is playing is customary in the IIHF event.
He suffered an injury in the semifinals against Finland but stayed in Canada's lineup for their gold medal game. In the finals against Russia, Hayton tied the game in the third-period to lead Canada to a gold medal. Hayton was named to the IIHF World Under 20 Championship Media All-Star Team.

Personal life
Hayton's father, Brian, was a defenceman for the Guelph Platers from 1985 to 1988 and the Peterborough Petes from 1988 to 1989.

Career statistics

Regular season and playoffs

International

Awards and honours

References

External links
 

2000 births
Living people
Arizona Coyotes draft picks
Arizona Coyotes players
Canadian ice hockey centres
Ice hockey people from Ontario
Ilves players
National Hockey League first-round draft picks
Sault Ste. Marie Greyhounds players
Sportspeople from Peterborough, Ontario
Tucson Roadrunners players